Podgórze (German name: Dittersbach) was a town of Poland,  by rail S.E. from Wałbrzych and  south-west of Wrocław. It has coal-mines, bleach-fields and match factories. Its population in 1905 was 9371.

Since 1934 Podgórze has been an administrative subdivision of Wałbrzych.

References

Former populated places in Poland